Luis Aguilar (born 14 September 1952) is a Costa Rican former swimmer. He competed in the men's 100 metre freestyle at the 1968 Summer Olympics.

References

External links
 

1952 births
Living people
Costa Rican male swimmers
Olympic swimmers of Costa Rica
Swimmers at the 1968 Summer Olympics
Sportspeople from San José, Costa Rica